Genisea is a town in the Vistonida municipal unit, within the municipality of Abdera in the Xanthi regional unit of Greece. It is the seat of the municipality Abdera. According to the 2011 census, the population of Genisea was 2,185 inhabitants.

History 
Genisea was ruled by the Ottoman Empire from 1478-1912 as Ottoman Turkish يڭيجه Yenice, more specifically Karasu Yenicesi (after the Nestos River, Mesta Karasu) or Tütün Yenicesi ('tobacco') to distinguish it from يڭيجۀ واردار Yenice-i Vardar, modern Giannitsa. In 1519 (Hijri 925) the town of Yenice-i Karasu had 215 households and 124 unmarried men and it was in the jurisdiction of Kasım Paşa. The town was a "has" of the Sultan, that is land directly owned by the Sultan.

Under the spellings "Yenidje" or "Yenidze", Genisea was famous for its superior Oriental tobacco, especially suited for cigarettes.  It lent its name to the Yenidze tobacco factory building in Dresden and to the British Yenidje Tobacco Company Limited.

See also
Vafeika

References

Populated places in Xanthi (regional unit)